Sophie Sinclair (born 5 April 1997) is a Scottish curler. She currently plays second on Team Rebecca Morrison.

Career

Juniors
Sinclair won the Scottish Under-17 curling championship in 2013. She joined the Sophie Jackson junior rink in 2016. In 2017, the Jackson team won the World Junior B championships, earning the right to represent Scotland at the 2017 World Junior Curling Championships. At the World Juniors, the team won the silver medal.

Women's
The Jackson junior team continued to play together following their junior career. In 2019, the team was invited to play in the third leg of the 2018–19 Curling World Cup, where they finished with a 2-4 record. Two weeks later, the team won the 2019 Scottish championship, defeating perennial winners Eve Muirhead in the final. Team Jackson had committed to play in the 2019 Winter Universiade (which ended just before the World Championships), so Scottish Curling initially wanted to send Muirhead to the 2019 World Women's Curling Championship as Scotland's representative. However, Team Jackson asked for a review of the rules, which stated the winner of the Scottish championship gets to represent the country at the World Championships. The review was successful, and Team Jackson went on to represent Scotland at the 2019 Worlds. They also played in the Universiade, where they finished fourth.

At the 2019 World Women's Curling Championship, Team Jackson finished in 10th place with a 4-8 record.

Personal life
She attended Edinburgh Napier University where she studied Business and Enterprise in Sport. She currently works as a personal trainer.

References

External links

Living people
1997 births
Scottish female curlers
Alumni of Edinburgh Napier University
Competitors at the 2019 Winter Universiade
Curlers from Edinburgh